KSBK may refer to:

 KSBK (FM), a radio station (100.3 MHz) licensed to serve Alamosa, Colorado, United States
 KSBK-LD, a low-power television station (channel 11, virtual 28) licensed to serve Colorado Springs, Colorado
 KSBK (AM) (later JORO), a radio station in Naha, Okinawa, Japan
 KSBK (later ProFauna Indonesia), the local partner of International Primate Protection League
 , a vocational school in Dortmund, Germany named for Karl Schiller

See also
 SBK (disambiguation)
 WSBK (disambiguation)
 CSBK (disambiguation)